Abdul Jabbar Abbas (1923 in Bab Al Shikh, Baghdad– December 3, 1992, in Baghdad) was an Iraqi actor. He was best known for his role Abu Shukur on the 1960s Iraqi television comedian Tahit Moos Al-Hallaq.

References

1923 births
1992 deaths
20th-century Iraqi male actors
Iraqi male television actors
People from Baghdad